Abu Lais Md. Mubin Chowdhury was a Bangladesh Nationalist Party politician and four-term Member of parliament from Habiganj-3.

Career
Chowdhury was elected to Parliament in 1988, 1991, and 1996 from Habiganj-3 as a Candidate of Jatiya Party. In 2000, he was a member of the Parliamentary Standing Committee on the Ministry of Planning. He lost the 2001 election to Awami League candidate Shah A M S Kibria. He is a former chairman of Habiganj Zila Parishad. He was nominated to contest a by-election in Habiganj-3 on 25 April 2005. The by-elections were called following the assassination of Member of Parliament of Habiganj-3 and Bangladesh Awami League politician, Shah A M S Kibria. He won the by-election. He lost the 2008 election to Md. Abu Zahir.

Death
Chowdhury died of a heart attack at Shaistanagar town in Habiganj city on December 27, and buried on the same day at Shastanagar graveyard.

References

1942 births
2013 deaths
People from Habiganj District
Bangladesh Nationalist Party politicians
Jatiya Party politicians
5th Jatiya Sangsad members
6th Jatiya Sangsad members
7th Jatiya Sangsad members
8th Jatiya Sangsad members